Nitel or NITEL may refer to:

 An RPG Group company based in Bhopal State in India, working in telecom infrastructure 
 NITEL (Nigerian company), Nigeria's principal telecommunication company
 NITEL (Russian company), a Russian TV sets manufacturing company located in Nizhny Novgorod